Home Grown Funnies is a single-issue underground comic book written and illustrated by Robert Crumb. Containing stories with staple Crumb characters Whiteman, the Snoid, and Angelfood McSpade, Home Grown Funnies went through sixteen printings by Kitchen Sink Press, selling at least 160,000 copies, and has been referred to as one of Crumb's longest-lived comics.

Publication history 
The comic was originally published in January 1971, and underwent fifteen consecutive printings.

Contents

Reception 
M. Thomas Fox of underground comix database Comixjoint gave Home Grown Funnies a 10/10 score, rating the writing as "brilliant" and the illustration as "exceptional". Fox added that "[t]he impressive longevity of Home Grown Funnies (16 printings and 160,000 copies sold in 30+ years) is a testament to the alluring power of Robert Crumb's 22-page epic love story, 'Whiteman Meets Bigfoot'. In this classic but unusually plotted (for Crumb) tragicomedy, a middle-class family man falls in love with a female Bigfoot in remote mountain territory and forsakes everything to fulfill his destiny with her".

References

1971 comics debuts
1971 comics endings
Underground comix
Comics by Robert Crumb
1971 in comics